Uncial 0160 (in the Gregory-Aland numbering), ε 018 (von Soden), is a Greek uncial manuscript of the New Testament, dated paleographically to the 4th century (or 5th).

Description 
The codex contains a small part of the Gospel of Matthew 26:25-26,34-36, on one parchment leaf (9.1 cm by 6.5 cm). It is written in two columns per page, 24 lines per page, in uncial letters. 

The Greek text of this codex is mixed. Aland placed it in Category III.

History 

Currently it is dated by the INTF to the 4th or 5th century.

The text of the codex was published by Gebhart.

The codex currently is housed at the Berlin State Museums, P. 9961 in Berlin.

See also 

 List of New Testament uncials
 Textual criticism

References

Further reading 

 A. H. Salonius, Die griechischen Handschriftenfragmente des Neuen Tastaments in den Staatlichen Museen zu Berlin, ZNW 26 (1927), pp. 99-100. 

Greek New Testament uncials
4th-century biblical manuscripts